Mariona Rebull is a 1943 novel by the Spanish writer Ignasi Agustí. It is a historical romance, set amongst the high society of nineteenth century Barcelona. A young, neglected wife begins a passionate affair which ultimately ends in tragedy.

In 1947 the novel was turned into a film of the same title, with Blanca de Silos playing the title role.

References

Bibliography
 Helio San Miguel, Lorenzo J. Torres Hortelano. World Film Locations: Barcelona. Intellect Books, 2013.

1943 novels
20th-century Spanish novels
Novels set in Barcelona
Novels set in the 19th century
Spanish novels adapted into films
Historical romance novels